Metria amella, the live oak metria moth, is a species of moth in the family Erebidae.

The MONA or Hodges number for Metria amella is 8666.

References

Further reading

 
 
 

Omopterini
Articles created by Qbugbot
Moths described in 1852